Timmy Kwebulana is a South African actor.

He has appeared in Abakwazidenge, Ingqumbo Yeminyanya, Unyana Womntu, Uthando Lwethu, Shooting Stars, Forced Love and Isikizi.

References

External links

Year of birth missing (living people)
Living people
South African male actors